is a railway station on the Kita-Osaka Kyuko Railway (which links directly into the Osaka Metro Midosuji Line) and Osaka Monorail located in Toyonaka, Osaka, Japan.

Lines
Kita-Osaka Kyuko Railway Namboku Line (Station Number: M08)
Osaka Monorail Main Line (Station Number: 15)

Kita-Osaka Kyuko Railway Namboku Line

Layout
There is an island platform on the second basement serving two tracks.

Music
arrival announcement
"Funiculì Funiculà" a Napolitan song relating with rail transit
"Home! Sweet Home!" composed by Henry Bishop, lyrics by John Howard Payne
departure announcement
Spring: "Spring Song" from "Song Without Words" Book 5, Op.62 by Felix Mendelssohn
Summer: Minuet from "L'Arlésienne" Suite No. 2 by Georges Bizet
Autumn (Fall): "Autumn Leaves" by Joseph Kosma
Winter: "Takibi" composed by Shigeru Watanabe, lyrics by Seika Tatsumi
Last train for Esaka: "Auld Lang Syne" a Scots poem

Osaka Monorail Main Line

Layout
There is an elevated island platform serving two lines.

Surroundings
Hankyu Oasis
Senchu Pal
Senri Selcy
Senri Hankyu
Senri Daimaru Plaza
Yamada Denki LABI Senri
Yomiuri Bunka Center
Senri Hankyu Hotel
Bus stops for Hankyu Bus Co., Ltd.

Stations next to Senri-Chūō

References

External links
 (Kita-Osaka Kyuko Railway Namboku Line)
 (Osaka Monorail Main Line)

Railway stations in Osaka Prefecture
Railway stations in Japan opened in 1970